Stripped Classicism (or "Starved Classicism" or "Grecian Moderne") is primarily a 20th-century classicist architectural style stripped of most or all ornamentation, frequently employed by governments while designing official buildings. It was adapted by both totalitarian and democratic regimes. The style embraces a "simplified but recognizable" classicism in its overall massing and scale while eliminating traditional decorative detailing. The orders of architecture are only hinted at or are indirectly implicated in the form and structure.

Despite its etymological similarity, Stripped Classicism is sometimes distinguished from "Starved Classicism", the latter "displaying little feeling for rules, proportions, details, and finesse, and lacking all verve and élan".  At other times the terms "stripped" and "starved" are used interchangeably.

Stripped Classicism was a materialistic manifestation of 'political' modernism. Recent historiography has explicitly linked this architectural style – and its relationship with modernist thinking – to political projects arising in the 1920–1930s, which utilised artistic dexterity to articulate – in built form – a powerful political ethos orientated towards the future. 

Other writers have noted the need to read the impact of avant-garde movements such as the Italian Futurists, who extolled the innumerable possibilities of the modern world, on this unique style (and the futurism it espoused). It was popularised by the French-born Paul Philippe Cret, among others, and employed in Nazi Germany, Fascist Italy, the Soviet Union and New Deal America.

Description and history 
Though the term is usually reserved for the more thorough style that forms part of 20th-century rational architecture, characteristics of Stripped Classicism are embodied in works of some progressive late 18th- and early 19th-century neoclassical architects, such as Étienne-Louis Boullée, Claude Nicolas Ledoux, Friedrich Gilly, Peter Speeth, Sir John Soane and Karl Friedrich Schinkel.

Between the World Wars, a stripped-down classicism became the de facto standard for many monumental and institutional governmental buildings all over the world. Governments used this architectural méthode to straddle modernism and classicism, an ideal political response to a modernizing world. In part, this movement was said to have origins in the need to save money in governmental works by eschewing the expense of hand-worked classical detail.

In Europe, examples as early as the Embassy of Germany, Saint Petersburg, designed by Peter Behrens and completed in 1912, "established models for the classical purity aspired to by high modernists like Mies van der Rohe but also for the oversized, Stripped Classicism of Hitler's, Stalin's and Ulbricht's architects and perhaps of American, British and French official buildings in the 1930s as well". The style later found adherents in the Fascist regimes of Germany and Italy as well as in the Soviet Union during Stalin's regime. Albert Speer's Zeppelinfeld and other parts of the Nazi party rally grounds complex outside Nuremberg were perhaps the most famous examples in Germany, using classical elements such as columns and altars alongside modern technology such as spotlights. The Casa del Fascio in Como has also been aligned with the movement. In the USSR some of the proposals for the unbuilt Palace of the Soviets also had characteristics of the style.

Among American architects, the work of Paul Philippe Cret exemplifies the style. His Château-Thierry American Monument built in 1928 has been identified as an early example. Among his other works identified with the style are the exterior of the 1933 Folger Shakespeare Library in Washington, D.C. (though not the Tudor Revival library interior), the 1937 University of Texas at Austin's Main Tower, the 1937 Federal Reserve Building in Washington, D.C. and the 1939 Bethesda Naval Hospital tower.

It is sometimes evident in buildings that were constructed by the Works Projects Administration during the Great Depression, albeit with a mix of Art Deco architecture or its elements. Related styles have been described as PWA Moderne and Greco Deco.

The movement was widespread, and transcended national boundaries. Architects who at least notably experimented in Stripped Classicism included John James Burnet, Giorgio Grassi, Léon Krier, Aldo Rossi, Albert Speer, Robert A. M. Stern and Paul Troost.

Despite its popularity with totalitarian regimes, it has been adapted by many English-speaking democratic governments, including during the New Deal in the United States. In any event, presumed "fascist" underpinnings have hampered acceptance into mainstream architectural thought. There is no evidence that architects who favored this style had a particular right-wing political disposition. Nevertheless, both Adolf Hitler and Benito Mussolini were fans. On the other hand, Stripped Classicism was favored by Joseph Stalin and various regional Communist regimes.

After the defeat of Nazi Germany and end of World War II, the style fell out of favor. However, it was somewhat revived in designs in the 1960s. Included was Philip Johnson's New York Lincoln Center for the Performing Arts, evidencing "a revival in the Stripped Classical style". Likewise, Canberra, Australia saw the Law Courts of the Australian Capital Territory (1961) and the National Library of Australia (1968) resurrect grand Stripped Classical designs. See Australian non-residential architectural styles.

The paradoxical embrace of old and new
The use of culture and 'myth' was a shared peculiarity of totalitarian political programmes during the 1920–30s, including Nazism in Germany and Soviet Communism in Russia. Cultural incentives launched by these states, and all their various intricacies, evoked currents of modernist thought.  

Through architecture, they strove to invoke the power of modernity in their physical landscapes (especially in their capital cities) and, simultaneously, reinvent the past (as symbolised by Stripped Classicism's restrained classical features) by ransacking its archetypal 'healthy' elements to inaugurate a reforged, rejuvenated, futural, open-ended and monumental future. 

It is this curious dichotomy between old and new, an inexorable feature of Stripped Classicism, which historian Roger Griffin has encapsulated in his conceptual framework of 'rooted modernism' (which he discusses in relation to fascist buildings). 

The modernism in Stripped Classical buildings can be seen through their stylistic components (mute apertures, blank walls and the absence of ornament) and through their pure functionality. Adolf Loos, an Austrian theorist of modern architecture, and his essay "Ornament and Crime" can be seen as just one of the many philosophers/theorists/architects who foreshadowed some of the stylistic elements of Stripped Classicism. 

Avant-garde movements such as Futurism also foreshadowed a form of building which is as much extravagant as it is streamlined, as much multi-functional as it is fit for the multi-faceted modern future vis-a-vis high-speed travel, technologically advanced means of communication, hydraulic engineering etc... "all in time for the most mechanised war in history", as Samuel Patterson writes.  

The Stripped Classical style was also embraced by Franklin D. Roosevelt, who yearned for an architecture symbolising a 'new beginning' under New Dealism (which was fighting to ameliorate the ramifications of the Great Depression), and concomitantly, archetypal American genius. A discussion of the Roosevelt administration, its reinvention of the past (centred on Jeffersonianism) and its uses of architecture in the 1930s can be found in Patterson's 'Problem-Solvers' thesis.

Notable examples

See also 
Boris Iofan
Constructivist architecture
Dulwich Picture Gallery and Mausoleum
Giuseppe Terragni
Nazi architecture
Nordic Classicism
Stalinist architecture
Stile Littorio

Notes

Citations

Sources

External links 

 
20th-century architectural styles
American architectural styles
Architectural styles
Art Deco architecture
Nazi architecture
Neoclassical architecture